Jeremy Tardy (born November 7, 1990) is an American actor best known for Dear White People on Netflix and 68 Whiskey on Paramount Network.

Career
Jeremy Tardy started acting in theater at the age of five. All throughout his school life he struggled with his grades when he began to focus on acting, saying, "I did not indulge in most things that kids my age were into...The biggest challenge I have faced was the challenge of staying on the right track as a teenager...I have had many friends get caught up in the street life and the trouble that comes with it." Jeremy's hard work earned him acceptance into Juilliard School. In 2016, he was cast as Rashid Bakr in the Netflix television adaptation as Dear White People. He was cast as Night Thrasher in New Warriors on Freeform, but the series would remain unaired before getting cancelled. On September 12, 2020, he left Dear White People and he will not appear in its final season. Tardy claims Lionsgate did not pay him and was discriminatory towards non-white actors.

Filmography

References

External links

1990 births
21st-century American male actors
American male film actors
American male television actors
Living people